Châu Thành is a rural district (huyện) of Hậu Giang province in the Mekong Delta region of Vietnam.

Divisions
The district is divided into 2 towns, Ngã Sáu and Mái Dầm, and 6 communes: Đông Phú, Đông Phước, Đông Phước A, Đông Thạnh, Phú Hữu and Phú Tân.

Districts of Hậu Giang province